Amphiplica is a genus of sea snails, marine gastropod mollusks in the family Caymanabyssiidae.

Distribution
This is a globally abyssal genus.

Species
Species within the genus Amphiplica include:
 Amphiplica concentrica (Thiele, 1909)
 Amphiplica knudseni McLean, 1988 
 Amphiplica plutonica Leal & Harasewych, 1999
 Amphiplica venezuelensis McLean, 1988
 Amphiplica (Gordabyssia) gordensis McLean, 1991

References

 Gofas, S.; Le Renard, J.; Bouchet, P. (2001). Mollusca, in: Costello, M.J. et al. (Ed.) (2001). European register of marine species: a check-list of the marine species in Europe and a bibliography of guides to their identification. Collection Patrimoines Naturels, 50: pp. 180–213

External links

Caymanabyssiidae